Asian records in athletics are the best marks set in an event by an athlete who competes for a member nation of the Asian Athletics Association. The organisation is responsible for ratification and it analyses each record before approving it. Records may be set in any continent and at any competition, providing that the correct measures are in place (such as wind-gauges) to allow for a verifiable and legal mark.

Outdoor

Key to tables:

h = hand timing

+ = en route to a longer distance

A = affected by altitude

a = aided road course according to IAAF rule 260.28

# = not recognised by association

NWI = no wind information

! = timing by photo-electric cell

Men

Women

Mixed

Indoor

Men

Women

Notes

References
General
Asian Records & Best Performances 30 July 2022 updated
Specific

External links
Asian Athletics Association website

 Asian
Athletics in Asia